Sebastian von Lahnstein is a fictional character from the German soap opera Verbotene Liebe (Forbidden Love). The character was portrayed by actor Joscha Kiefer from 26 November 2007 to 13 October 2009. The part was recast with Sebastian Schlemmer who took over the role on 19 October 2009.

Storylines

Background
Sebastian is born as the second child of Ludwig von Lahnstein and his wife Madeline. He grows up in the United States, after Ludwig's father Dietrich disproved of Madeline, who was employed as a maid of the Lahnstein family. Ludwig never forgave his father for not accepting Madeline and also broke ties with his brother Johannes. When Madeline murders an influential businessman in Patagonia, Ludwig takes the blame and is arrested for the crime. Believing their father has died in a sailing accident, Sebastian and his siblings become attached to Ludwig's best friend Adrian Degenhardt as a father figure. As Madeline dies after a long illness, Adrian becomes their legal guardian and takes care of the children's education. Sebastian's older brother Hagen suddenly leaves the family after both of his parents apparently died and Sebastian becomes a strong man who tries to hold the family together. Adrian enables Sebastian to study at Harvard University, where he becomes an attorney at law.

Return to Königsbrunn
In 2007, Sebastian returns to Düsseldorf to visit Adrian, who puts his business around destroying Johannes for taking his great love Francesca. Sebastian runs into Jana von Lahnstein as her car breaks down. He helps her and even wants to ask her out as she replies that she's married, but would like to see him again as a friend. Jana wants to give him her number, but as soon as Sebastian realizes her last name, Sebastian shows no interest in her any longer and leaves a confused Jana behind. Sebastian decides to help Adrian with his war against Johannes and the Lahnstein family because of what Ludwig told his family. According to Ludwig, Johannes was responsible for cutting him out of Dietrich's will and also sided with his father, when Ludwig decided to be with Madeline. Not knowing who he is, Sebastian outs himself on a charity event at Königsbrunn as Ludwig's son; leaving Johannes and his family shocked. Johannes tries to talk to his nephew, but it does not take long for them to fight about the past. In the end, Johannes warns Sebastian about Adrian and tries to make him understand that this man will only use him to his own advantage. Sebastian laughs at Johannes' warning and tells him all about what Adrian did for him and his siblings after his parents have died and Johannes was nowhere to be seen. With Johannes and Sebastian being at odds, Johannes' daughter Carla decides to pay her cousin a visit. Carla realizes that Sebastian is a good man and they enjoy having breakfast together. But as the conversation shifts to Johannes, Sebastian does not want to hear what Carla has to say. He tells her that it was great to see her again and it would be nice to talk again as long as Johannes is not the subject. Carla decides to talk to her father about what happened all those years ago. Johannes tells his daughter the story of Ludwig and Madeline and Dietrich's disapproval. But he eventually makes it clear that he did not side with his father and even tried to stay in contact with Ludwig. All the letters he wrote him back then came back unopened and unanswered. Carla uses these letters to tell Sebastian the truth and the young lawyer realizes that Johannes is not the bad person Ludwig made him out to be. But before he can speak to Johannes, his uncle goes on a business trip from which he never returns as his plane goes down over the Atlantic. Sebastian leaves Adrian with his plan for revenge alone, but tries to stay neutral between him and Lahnsteins. This eventually becomes a problem when Sebastian receives a call from Tanja von Anstetten, former lover of his cousin Ansgar, meant for Adrian. Sebastian finds out that Tanja is supposed to be dead after committing suicide as a result of her son's death. He finds out that Tanja faked not only her own death, but also that of her son and Ansgar's Hannes and that Adrian helped them. Sebastian sides with the Lahnsteins and, with the help of Carla and her brother Leonard, tries to get Hannes returned to Ansgar. After that the bond between Adrian and Sebastian slowly breaks, even though Sebastian realizes that both sides have their share of dark secrets.

Between heaven and hell
Sebastian is not sure about staying in Düsseldorf, but changes his mind when he meets Lydia Brandner. He immediately falls in love with her and is happy when Lydia feels the same way. But as soon as they could be happy together, Lydia, who's working for the Department of Children's and Young Peoples' Affairs, first case is to decide the custody battle between Ansgar and Tanja over Hannes. As Lydia's boss makes it clear that a relationship with a member of the Lahnstein family would be highly inappropriate and she would risk her job, Lydia forbids herself from seeing Sebastian. But he is not ready to give up on her and plans a romantic dinner, where they share their first kiss. As Lydia's job keeps getting in their way, she breaks up with him. Sebastian is heartbroken and finds comfort in Lydia's mother Katja, which ends in sleeping with her. Katja and Sebastian both agree that no one ever can find out about that night they spent together, especially after Lydia shortly after changes her mind and reunites with Sebastian. Things go from bad to worse when Katja finds out that she's pregnant and either her husband Matthias or Sebastian is the father. As Lydia finds out the truth she leaves Sebastian again and tries to move on with Sebastian's best friend Jens Kramer. Sebastian and Jens are at a crossroads with their friendship as Jens is disgusted with what Sebastian has done to Lydia. Jens and Lydia become a couple, while Sebastian cannot forget about Lydia. In the meanwhile, Jens becomes obsessed with Lydia and tries to have her all to herself; manipulating her friends, bugging her family's house and getting her in trouble at her job. Sebastian suspects Jens of his doings and tries to catch him. Jens realizes that Sebastian is a constant danger to his relationship to Lydia and kidnaps him. Lydia is questioning Sebastian's disappearance and eventually finds out all about Jens. As Sebastian can be rescued she realizes that she's still in love with Sebastian and that she has almost lost him. The two reunite once again and Sebastian comforts Lydia as her mother died after giving birth to a baby girl. With the paternity still in question, Sebastian and Matthias decide after long fights to take a test. The men are shocked when it turns out that Sebastian is Christina's father and decide to keep it a secret to secure Sebastian and Lydia's future together. The happy-again couple gets married when Lydia is in for a shock. When Christina has an accident, the truth about her paternity comes to light. Lydia is heartbroken and feels once again cheated not only by Sebastian but also by her father Matthias. Sebastian and Lydia separate for a little while before reuniting with Sebastian's promise that Matthias will be raising Christina. But Sebastian's feelings for his daughter are strong and he uses every chance he gets to be close to her. As Sebastian is planning to take legal actions against Matthias, his marriage with Lydia is yet in danger again. His undeniable feelings towards his daughter, and having to work overtime hours, puts a drift between Lydia and Sebastian. This leads Lydia to start an affair with Ansgar. When Sebastian finds out about the affair, he's outraged and sees his marriage lying in ruins. Lydia has to confess that she has fallen in love with Ansgar, which puts an end to her marriage with Sebastian.

Return from the dead and the forgotten son
In late 2009, the truth about Ludwig comes out, when Sebastian's siblings Helena and Tristan get him out of prison and return with him to Königsbrunn. At first everyone is happy to see Ludwig, but Sebastian starts to raise questions. He wants to know what kept his father from his family all those years, while he took care of his siblings. Ludwig tells his children that he went to prison to protect Madeline and not wanting his children have to live with a father behind bars. Even though Sebastian accepts Ludwig's decision, he is not sure how to deal with his father. As Ludwig becomes the head of the family's company because of Carla's absence, he and Sebastian have more and more confrontations with each other. In 2011, Ludwig is diagnosed with leukemia and as none of his children or other family members are a match for a kidney transplant, the family opens up about Hagen for the first time in years. They eventually find him in the Netherlands, where he handles with diamonds. While Ludwig is happy to see his son and is rescued by him, Hagen's siblings are not so forgiving. First of all Sebastian, who will never forgive Hagen for leaving him with his siblings alone. Helena, Tristan and Rebecca can forgive Hagen in the end, but Sebastian sees in him an irresponsible hypocrite. As Ludwig starts to put his trust in Hagen, he also starts a sibling rivalry and damages his relationship with Sebastian even more.

Moving to a darker side
Hurt over Lydia's affair with Ansgar, Sebastian starts teaming up with Tanja. He handles her divorce from Ansgar, which leaves her with a lot of cash. When Sebastian's divorce from Lydia, who's pregnant with Ansgar's child, becomes finalized, her feelings for Ansgar seem already starting to reduce because of his schemes against the people around him. Sebastian spends one last passionate moment with Lydia and tells her that a part of him will always love her. In the meanwhile, Sebastian's affair with Tanja resulted in her being pregnant as well. As Lydia leaves Königsbrunn to start over in New Zealand, she writes Sebastian a letter where she once again apologizes for her affair and that she wished things had turned out differently. Tanja realizes that Sebastian still loves Lydia and is determined to keep things between them as business partners after they joined Lahnstein Enterprises. But soon Tanja is confronted with her feelings for Sebastian, while he learns more about Tanja and starts to see her in another light. When he finds out that Tanja has fallen in love with him, he first tries to use her feelings as he fears that Tanja might eventually skip town with his child, knowing what she's capable of after faking Hannes' death. He even proposes to her, but Tanja turns him down several times, before finally accepting. Eventually Sebastian really starts to understand Tanja and comforts her, when she's confronted with her father's abuse. As Tanja keeps having hallucinations about her dead father, she accidentally shoots Sebastian thinking he's her father. Ludwig captures the accident on tape and wants to use it against Tanja, if necessary. Sebastian later demands to give the tape back into his hands, while Tanja has no idea that the tape even exists. When she finds it in Sebastian's belongings, she's heartbroken and breaks off her engagement with Sebastian. Before going on a business trip to Paris, Tanja tells Sebastian that she never ever wants to see him again and he will never know his child. Sebastian, who truly loves Tanja, is determined to win her back whatever it takes. After a reconciliation, the pair marries. Shortly afterward, they have a daughter, Emma von Lahnstein, who Sebastian delivers while they are trapped in an elevator.

Notes

Verbotene Liebe characters
Fictional counts and countesses
Fictional lawyers
Fictional business executives
Television characters introduced in 2007